If That's What It Takes is the debut studio album by American singer-songwriter Michael McDonald. The album was released in August 1982 and peaked at #6 on Billboard 200, while singles "I Keep Forgettin' (Every Time You're Near)" went to #4 and "I Gotta Try" was #44 on Billboard Hot 100.

Track listing

Personnel 
 Michael McDonald – lead vocals, backing vocals (1, 3, 4, 6, 7, 8, 10), Fender Rhodes (1, 2, 3, 7, 9, 10), synthesizers (1-4, 6-8), acoustic piano (4, 5, 6, 8)
 Greg Phillinganes – acoustic piano (1, 3, 7, 10), clavinet (2), Fender Rhodes (4), Hammond organ (9)
 Michael Boddicker – additional synthesizers (4)
 Michael Omartian – Fender Rhodes (6, 8)
 Dean Parks – guitar (1, 3, 7, 9), guitar overdubs (8)
 Steve Lukather – guitar (2, 4, 6, 8, 10)
 Robben Ford – guitar solo (6, 7)
 Willie Weeks – bass (1, 3, 4, 7, 9, 10)
 Louis Johnson – bass (2)
 Mike Porcaro – bass (6, 8)
 Steve Gadd – drums (1, 3, 4, 7, 9, 10)
 Jeff Porcaro – drums (2, 6, 8)
 Lenny Castro – percussion (1, 6, 7, 8, 10)
 Bobby LaKind – percussion (1)
 Paulinho da Costa – percussion (3, 4)
 Ted Templeman – percussion (4)
 Edgar Winter – saxophone solo (1, 10)
 Tom Scott – saxophone solo (6), Lyricon solo (9)
 Ed Sanford – backing vocals (1)
 Maureen McDonald – backing vocals (2, 6)
 Kenny Loggins – backing vocals (4)
 Christopher Cross – backing vocals (6)
 Brenda Russell – backing vocals (6)
 Kathy Walker – backing vocals (6)
 Amy Holland – backing vocals (6)

Production 
 Produced by Lenny Waronker and Ted Templeman
 Engineers – Ken Deane, Bobby Hata, Lee Herschberg, James Isaacson, Donn Landee, Mark Linett and Steve McManus.
 Overdub Engineers – Lee Herschberg, James Isaacson, Donn Landee and Mark Linett.
 Mixing – Lee Herschberg
 Mastered by Bobby Hata at Warner Bros. Recording Studio.
 Horn arrangements – Jerry Hey
 String arrangements – Marty Paich
 Keyboard Technician – Paul Mederios
 Production Coordinators – Joan Parker, Kathy Walker and Vicki Fortson.
 Art Direction and Design – Jeff Adamoff
 Photography – Jim Shea
 Direction – Irving Azoff

Charts

References

1982 debut albums
Albums arranged by Marty Paich
Albums produced by Lenny Waronker
Albums produced by Ted Templeman
Michael McDonald (musician) albums
Warner Records albums